Butte Central Catholic High School is a private, Roman Catholic high school in Butte, Montana. It is one of two high schools in the Roman Catholic Diocese of Helena, the other being Loyola Sacred Heart in Missoula.  Their mascot is the Maroons.

Montana High School Association State Championships
List of state championships attained by the school:
 Boys Basketball – 1950, 1956, 1978, 1984, 1992, 2020, 2022
 Boys Football - 1945, 1948, 1952, 1969, 1971, 1972, 1973
 Boys Swimming - 1996, 2003
 Boys Golf - 1978, 1989
 Boys Cross Country - 1968, 1971, 1972, 1973, 1980
 Boys Track and Field - 1982
 Boys Wrestling - 1983
 Girls Basketball - 1981, 1982, 2011, 2016
 Girls Softball - 1997, 1999, 2000
 Girls Track and Field - 1981, 1982, 1983

Notable alumni and faculty
Amanda Curtis, math and physics teacher from 2004 to 2006, member of Montana House of Representatives, Democratic candidate for U.S. Senate in 2014 
Rob "Robbie" Johnson, MLB catcher for Seattle Mariners, San Diego Padres, New York Mets, and St. Louis Cardinals, graduated 2001
Jerry J. O'Connell, former member of United States House of Representatives
Robert O'Neill, decorated Navy SEAL; revealed in November 2014 to be Navy SEAL who killed Osama bin Laden during raid on Bin Laden's compound in Pakistan on May 1, 2011
Jim Sweeney, college and pro football coach, head coach at Washington State, Montana State and Fresno State, class of 1947
George Leo Thomas, Bishop of the Diocese of Helena
Brian Morris, Stanford University football player, Montana Supreme Court Judge
William P. Garvey (R.PH.), Oregon State University.  An early pioneer of compounding in Orange County, California, beginning in 1980.

References

Catholic secondary schools in Montana
Catholic schools in Montana
Educational institutions established in 1892
Schools accredited by the Northwest Accreditation Commission
Buildings and structures in Butte, Montana
Schools in Silver Bow County, Montana
1892 establishments in Montana
Roman Catholic Diocese of Helena